Singapore English (SgE, SE, en-SG) (officially similar and related to British English) is the set of varieties of the English language native to Singapore. In Singapore, English is spoken in two main forms: Singaporean Standard English (indistinguishable grammatically from Standard British English) and Singapore Colloquial English (better known as Singlish).

Singapore is a cosmopolitan city, with 37% of its population born outside the country. Singaporeans, even those of the same ethnic group, have many different first languages and cultures. For example, in 2005, among Chinese Singaporeans, over a third spoke English as their main language at home while almost half spoke Mandarin, and the rest spoke various mutually unintelligible varieties of Chinese. In the Indian community, most Singaporeans of Indian descent speak either English or a South Asian language. The English language is now the most popular medium of communication among students from primary school to university. Many families use two or three languages on a regular basis, and English is often one of them. The level of fluency in English among residents in Singapore also varies greatly from person to person, depending on their educational background.

Classification of Singapore English 
Singapore English can be classified into Singapore Standard English (SSE) and Singapore Colloquial English (Singlish). The language consists of three sociolects; Acrolect, Mesolect, and Basilect. Both Acrolect and Mesolect are regarded as Standard Singapore English, while Basilect is considered as Singlish. 
 Acrolect; there is no significant and consistent difference from the features of Standard British English (SBE).
 Mesolect; it has some features distinct from SBE 
 Question tenses in an indirect form; e.g. "May I ask where is the toilet?"
 Indefinite article deletion (copula absence); e.g. "May I apply for car licence?" (Instead of saying "a" car licence)
 Lack of marking in verb forms (Regularisation); e.g. "He always go to the shopping centre."
 Basilect (Singlish); 
 Generalised "is it" question tag; e.g. "You coming today, Is it?"
 Consistent copula deletion; e.g. "My handwriting no good, lah."
 Use of particles like ah; lah, e.g. "Wait ah; Hurry lah, I need to go now!"

Singaporeans vary their language according to social situations (Pakir 1991) and attitudes that they want to convey (Poedjosoedarmo 1993). Better educated Singaporeans with a "higher" standard of English tend to speak "Standard" Singapore English (the acrolect), whereas those who are less-educated or whose first language isn't English tend to speak Singlish (the basilect). Gupta (1994) said that most Singaporean speakers systematically alternate between colloquial and formal language depending on the formality of the situation. The constant use of both SSE and Singlish has resulted in the gradual emergence of a mesolect, an intermediate form of Singapore English, half-way between formal and informal Singapore English.

Standard Singapore English 
Standard Singapore English is the standard form of English used in Singapore. It generally resembles British English and is often used in more formal settings such as the workplace or when communicating with people of higher authority such as teachers, bosses and government officials. Singapore English acts as the "bridge" among different ethnic groups in Singapore. Standard Singapore English retains British spelling and grammar.

History

The British established a trading post on the island of Singapore in 1819, and the population grew rapidly thereafter, attracting many immigrants from Chinese provinces and from India. The roots of Standard Singapore English derive from nearly a century and a half of British control. Its local character seems to have developed early in the English-medium schools of the 19th and early-20th centuries, where the teachers often came from India and Ceylon, as well as from various parts of Europe and from the United States of America. By 1900 Eurasians and other locals were employed as teachers. Apart from a period of Japanese occupation (1942-1945), Singapore remained a British colony until 1963, when it joined the Malaysian federation, but this proved a short-lived alliance, largely due to ethnic rivalries. Since its expulsion from the Federation in 1965, Singapore has operated as an independent city-state. English served as the administrative language of the British colonial government, and when Singapore gained self-government in 1959 and independence in 1965, the Singaporean government decided to keep English as the main language to maximise economic prosperity. The use of English as the nation's first language serves to bridge the gap between the diverse ethnic groups in Singapore; English operates as the lingua franca of the nation. The use of English – as the global language for commerce, technology and science – also helped to expedite Singapore's development and integration into the global economy. Public schools use English as the main language of instruction, although students are also required to receive part of their instruction in their mother tongue; placement in such courses is based on ethnicity and not without controversy.
The standard Singaporean accent used to be officially RP. However, in recent decades, a standard Singaporean accent, quite independent of any external standard, including RP, started to emerge. A 2003 study by the National Institute of Education in Singapore suggests that a standard Singaporean pronunciation is emerging and is on the cusp of being standardised.
Singaporean accents can be said to be largely non-rhotic.

Singapore's Speak Good English Movement 
The wide use of Singlish led the government to launch the Speak Good English Movement in Singapore in 2000 in an attempt to replace Singlish with Standard English. This movement was made to show the need for Singaporeans to speak Standard English. Nowadays, all children in schools are being taught Standard English with one of the other official languages (Chinese, Malay, Tamil) being taught as a second language. In Singapore, English is a "working language" that serves the economy and development and is associated with the broader global community. Meanwhile, the rest are "mother tongues" that are associated with the country's culture. Speaking Standard English also helps Singaporeans communicate and express themselves in their everyday life.

The Singaporean government recently made an announcement named "Speak Good English Movement brings fun back to Grammar and good English" where the strategies used to promote their program are explained. Specifically, it would release a series of videos that demystify the difficulty and dullness of the grammatical rules of the English language. These videos provide a more humorous approach to learning basic grammar rules. Singaporeans will now be able to practise the grammatical rules in both written and spoken English thanks to a more interactive approach.

Standard Singaporean accent 
Like most Commonwealth countries outside of Canada, the accents of most reasonably educated Singaporeans who speak English as their first language are more similar to British Received Pronunciation (RP) than General American, although immediately noticeable differences exist.

Malay, Indian, and Chinese Influences 
Although Standard Singapore English (SSE) is mainly influenced by British English and, recently, American English, there are other languages that also contribute to its use on a regular basis. The majority of Singaporeans speak more than one language, with many speaking three to four. Most Singaporean children are brought up bilingual. They are introduced to Malay, Chinese, Tamil, or Singapore Colloquial English (Singlish) as their native languages, depending on their families' ethnic backgrounds and/or socioeconomic status. They also acquire those languages from interacting with friends in school and other places. Naturally, the presence of other languages in Singapore has influenced Singapore English, something particularly apparent in Singlish.

Both Singapore English and Singapore colloquial English are used with multiple accents. Because Singaporeans speak different ethnic mother tongues, they exhibit ethnic-specific features in their speech such that their ethnicity can be readily identified from their speech alone. The strength of one's ethnic mother tongue-accented English accent depends on factors like formality and their language dominance. Words from Malay, Chinese, and Tamil are also borrowed, if not code-switched, into Singapore English. For example, the Malay words "makan" (to eat), "habis" (finished), and the Hokkien word "kiasu" are constantly used and adopted to SE vocabularies, to the point that Singaporeans are not necessarily aware of which language those words are from. Furthermore, the word "kiasu" has been used in the Singapore press since 2000 without being italicised; Kiasu means "always wanting the best for oneself and willing to try hard to get it". In another journal, "Kiasu" is also defined as 'characterised by a grasping or selfish attitude arising from a fear of missing out on something' (usu. adj., definition from OED (Simpson and Weiner 2000); Hokkien kia(n)su).

Foreign dialects of English in Singapore 

A wide range of foreign English dialects can be heard in Singapore. American and British accents are often heard on local television and radio due to the frequent airing of foreign television programmes.

Singapore Colloquial English / Singlish 

Unlike Singapore Standard English, Singlish includes many discourse particles and loan words from Malay, Mandarin and Hokkien. Many of such loan words include swear words, such as Kanina and Chee Bai. Hence, it is commonly regarded with low prestige in the country and not used in formal communication.

However, Singlish has been used in several locally produced films, including Army Daze, Mee Pok Man and Talking Cock the Movie, among others. Some local sitcoms, in particular Phua Chu Kang Pte Ltd, also feature extensive use of Singlish.

The proliferation of Singlish has been controversial and the use of Singlish is not endorsed by the government. Singapore's first two prime ministers, Lee Kuan Yew and Goh Chok Tong, have publicly declared that Singlish is a substandard variety that handicaps Singaporeans, presents an obstacle to learning standard English, and renders the speaker incomprehensible to everyone except another Singlish speaker. The country's third and current prime minister, Lee Hsien Loong, has also said that Singlish should not be part of Singapore's identity. In addition, the government launched the Speak Good English Movement in 2000 to encourage Singaporeans to speak proper English.

Despite strong criticisms of Singlish, linguist David Yoong has put forward the argument that "Singaporeans who subscribe to Singlish and have a positive attitude towards the code see Singlish as a language that transcends social barriers" and that the language can be used to "forge rapport and, perhaps more importantly, the Singaporean identity". Sociolinguist Anthea Fraser Gupta also argues that Singlish and standard English can and do co-exist, saying that "there is no evidence that the presence of Singlish causes damage to standard English". This was followed by organisers of the Speak Good English Movement clarifiying that they are "not anti-Singlish", with their primary intention instead to ensure that Singaporeans are able to speak standard English first. A spokesperson was quoted as saying: "The presence of Singlish causes damage to standard English only when people do not have a good grounding in standard English".

English language trends in Singapore 
In 2010, speakers of English in Singapore were classified into five different groups: 
 Those who have no knowledge of English (extremely few people, most of whom were born before the 1940s);
 Those who regard English as a foreign language, have limited command of, and seldom speak the language (mostly the older age groups);
 Those who learnt English at school and can use it but have a dominant other language (many people, of all ages);
 Those who learnt English at school and use it as their dominant language (many people, of all ages);
 Those who learnt English as a native language (sometimes as a sole native language, but usually alongside other languages) and use it as their dominant language (many people, mostly children born after 1965 to highly educated parents).

, English is the most commonly spoken language in Singaporean homes. One effect of mass immigration into Singapore since 2000, especially from China, has been to increase the proportion of the population to whom English is a foreign language. The trend favours an increasing use of English, and stability in Mandarin use at the expense of other varieties of Chinese (apparently as the Chinese population switches first to Mandarin, then to English), while Malay use slowly erodes.

In 2010, 52% of Chinese children and 26% of Malay children aged between 5 and 14 speak English at home, as compared to 36% and 9.4% respectively in 2000.

Other official languages in Singapore 
English is Singapore's main and one of the four official languages, along with Malay, Chinese and Tamil. The symbolic national language is Malay for historical reasons. All official signs, legislation and documents are required to be in English, although translations in the other official languages are sometimes included, though it is not necessary. Under the education system, English is the language of instruction for all subjects except the official Mother Tongue languages (the other three official languages) and the literatures of those languages.

See also 
 International Phonetic Alphabet chart for English dialects
 Singlish
 Speak Good English Movement

References

Further reading
 

Dialects of English
S
City colloquials